Yuriy Vasilyevich Smoloviy (Юрий Васильевич Смоловый, born 9 April 1970) is a Russian Kazakhstani male water polo player. He was a member of the Russia men's national water polo team and Kazakhstan men's national water polo team, playing as a centre forward. He was a part of the Russian team at the 1996 Summer Olympics and of the Kazakhstani team at the 2000 Summer Olympics and 2004 Summer Olympics. On club level he played for Lukoil-Spartak in Russia.

See also
 List of World Aquatics Championships medalists in water polo

References

External links
 

1970 births
Living people
Russian male water polo players
Kazakhstani male water polo players
Water polo players at the 1996 Summer Olympics
Water polo players at the 2000 Summer Olympics
Water polo players at the 2004 Summer Olympics
Olympic water polo players of Kazakhstan
Olympic water polo players of Russia
Water polo players at the 2002 Asian Games
Asian Games medalists in water polo
Asian Games gold medalists for Kazakhstan
Sportspeople from Volgograd
Medalists at the 2002 Asian Games